Johan Petersson, (born 10 February 1969) is a Swedish comedian, actor, television presenter and author.

Petersson started his career in 1992 when presenting the Disney Club (Disneyklubben) which was broadcast on SVT, this along with Alice Bah Kuhnke and Eva Röse. Between 1994 and 1995, Petersson along with Mia Ståhl Broborg and Nicke Wagemyr participated in the Apolloteaterns play Ståmatålmannen. He never himself applied to stage school but went to summer theater school class in 1996. There he met Peter Settman and Fredde Granberg, this led to several TV productions together. In 2006, Petersson wrote three children's books with the miniseries Den sista snapphanen. He used the name Johan F. Petersson on his published books.

He presented the Swedish version of "Hole in the Wall" on TV6 in 2009, and "Jag vet vad du gjorde förra lördagen" on TV3, also in 2009. In later years Petersson has acted in several comedy shows on Kanal 5, like, Cafe Bärs, Partaj and Helt perfekt.

Between 2011 and 2015 he participated in the humor program Partaj on Kanal 5 and in the spin-off Café Bärs that had premiere in 2013. At the Kristallen 2012, 2013 and 2015, Partaj won Kristallen for year's humor program.

In 2018, he acted in the children's film Hotell Gyllene Knorren – filmen. In 2017, he had a leading role in the children's film Monky.

Bibliography
Fångad i framtiden. B. Wahlströms ungdomsböcker, 99-0117885-1 ; 3253. Den siste snapphanen ; 1. Stockholm: 2006. 
Jakten på Loshultsskatten. B. Wahlströms ungdomsböcker, 99-0117885-1 ; 3254. Den siste snapphanen ; 2. Stockholm: 2006. 
Häxans hemlighet. B. Wahlströms ungdomsböcker, 99-0117885-1 ; 3263. Den siste snapphanen ; 3. Stockholm: 2007.

References

External links 

Living people
1969 births
Swedish comedians
Swedish actors
Swedish television hosts